Sten Olof Håkan Johansson (born 31 July 1937) is a Swedish politician, who was the leader of the Swedish Centre Party from 1987 to 1998 and Minister for the Environment from 1991 to 1994.

Olof Johansson was born in Ljungby, Kalmar County. He studied at the Stockholm School of Economics, and was the leader of the Centre Party youth organisation from 1969 to 1971. In 1971 he was elected a Member of the Swedish Parliament, a position he held until 1976, and again 1978–1979 and 1982–1998. He held cabinet posts in the centre-right governments 1976–1978 and 1979–1982. In 1987 he succeeded Karin Söder, who stepped down due to health reasons, as the leader of the Centre Party. When the centre-right regained power in 1991, Johansson became Minister for the Environment in the Carl Bildt government, but left the post over his opposition to the construction of the Oresund Bridge in the summer of 1994, shortly before the Social Democrats regained power in the September elections.

After having seen his party doing badly in the elections of 1994 and still trailing in the polls less than a year before the upcoming 1998 elections, Johansson stepped down as party leader, leaving the fate of the party in the hands of his little-known successor Lennart Daléus, prompting the Centre Party to print election posters with a portrait of Daléus, simply saying "This is Lennart".

In 1999, he was awarded the Illis quorum.

After his withdrawal from politics he has been appointed as Chairman of the board of various institutions and companies. Most notably, he was the chairman of the Swedish state-owned alcohol monopoly company, Systembolaget, between 2002 and 2009.

References

1937 births
Living people
Members of the Riksdag from the Centre Party (Sweden)
Leaders of political parties in Sweden
Swedish Ministers for Communications
Stockholm School of Economics alumni
Recipients of the Illis quorum
Swedish Ministers for Nordic Cooperation